Bad Honnef is a spa town in Germany near Bonn in the Rhein-Sieg district, North Rhine-Westphalia. It is located on the border of the neighbouring state Rhineland-Palatinate. To the north it lies on the slopes of the Drachenfels (“Dragon's Rock”) mountain, part of the Siebengebirge.

Overview
This discovery led to Honnef, as the town was called at the time, transforming from a wine-growing town to a spa town, adding the prefix Bad to its name. The mineral spring has been used for both drinking and bathing.

The villages of Aegidienberg, Selhof and Rhöndorf are considered to be part of Bad Honnef. During his term as first chancellor of the Federal Republic of Germany (then West Germany), Konrad Adenauer lived (and died) in Bad Honnef, as it was near Bonn, then the capital of the republic. Also, German politician and leader of the Free Democratic Party Guido Westerwelle was born in Bad Honnef.

Since the 1980s Bad Honnef has developed into an important place for conferences in Germany. Because of the close proximity to the still internationally important Federal City of Bonn, many federal institutions are located in Bad Honnef.

The head office of the Nationalpark Siebengebirge project was also planned to be in Bad Honnef; however the project was rejected in a referendum on 27 September 2009.

Bad Honnef has the highest purchasing power of all towns in North Rhine-Westphalia; its percentage of millionaires is also one of the highest.

Mayors

Twin towns – sister cities

Bad Honnef is twinned with:
 Berck, France
 Cadenabbia (Griante), Italy
 Ludvika, Sweden
 Wittichenau, Germany

Notable people
Curt Haase (1881–1943), general in World War II 
Boris Papandopulo (1906–1991), composer and conductor
Franz Brungs (born 1936), football player and coach
Peter Frankenberg (born 1947), professor and politician (CDU), minister in Baden-Württemberg
Peter Hintze (1950–2016), politician (CDU), 2013–2016 Vice-President of the Bundestag
Guido Westerwelle (1961–2016), politician (FDP), Foreign Minister and Vice Chancellor of Germany (2009–2013)

References

External links 

 
 Stadt Bad Honnef 
 International University of Applied Sciences, Bad Honnef 
 Physikzentrum Bad Honnef 
 Information about Bad Honnef, from campus-germany.de 

 
Populated places on the Rhine
Spa towns in Germany
Districts of the Rhine Province